Richard Carrillo (born in 1967 in Belen, New Mexico) is an American politician and was a Democratic member of the Nevada Assembly who served from February 7, 2011 to November 4, 2020 representing District 18. Carrillo is a member of the National Hispanic Caucus of State Legislators.

Elections
2014 - Having one person file against Carrillo in March 2014, this race went to the General election. His opponent Amy Beaulieu whose only endorsement was from a well funded group called Everytown for Gun Safety (formerly Mayors Against Illegal Guns)had many paid walkers going through Assembly District 18 door to door campaigning against Carrillo.  
2012 - Carrillo was unopposed for both the June 12, 2012 Democratic Primary and the November 6, 2012 General election, winning with 15,666 votes.
2010 - Due to term limits Assembly District 18 seat was open, Carrillo won the three-way race against Venecia Considine (Assembly Democratic Caucus Endorsed Candidate) and Lon West (A Political Hero)June 8, 2010 Democratic Primary with 1,639 votes (53.54%), and won the November 2, 2010 General election with 9,291 votes (61.39%) against Republican nominee Ken Walther.

References

External links
Official page at the Nevada Legislature
Campaign site
 

Date of birth missing (living people)
1967 births
Living people
Hispanic and Latino American state legislators in Nevada
Democratic Party members of the Nevada Assembly
People from the Las Vegas Valley
People from Belen, New Mexico
21st-century American politicians